Poor Man's Orange is a novel by New Zealand born Australian author Ruth Park. Published in 1949, the book is the sequel to The Harp in the South (1948) and continues the story of the Darcy family, living in the Surry Hills area of Sydney.

Television

Like its predecessor The Harp In The South, Poor Man's Orange was also adapted for Australian television by the Ten Network in 1987.

Cast
 Anne Phelan as Mumma Darcy (Margaret)
 Martyn Sanderson as Hughie Darcy
 Anna Hruby as Roie (Rowena) Rothe
 Kaarin Fairfax as Dolour Darcy
 Gwen Plumb as Granny Kilker
 Shane Connor as Charlie Rothe
 Syd Conabere as Pat Diamond
 Ron Shand as Bumper Reilly
 Emily Nicol as Motty (Moira) Rothe
 Brandon Burke as Tommy Mendel
 Lois Ramsay as Mrs. Campion
 Cecil Parkee as Lick Jimmy
 Carole Skinner as Delie Stock
 Charles Tingwell as Father Cooley
 Brendan Han Tjahjadi as Roger Bubba
 Kerry Walker as Miss Moon

The Harp in the South and Poor Man's Orange have been released by Roadshow Entertainment as a 3-DVD package.

References

External links
 
Poor Man's Orange at Australian Screen Online

1949 Australian novels
Network 10 original programming
Television shows based on Australian novels
Period television series
Novels set in Sydney
Novels by Ruth Park
1980s Australian television miniseries
1987 Australian television series debuts
1987 Australian television series endings
Surry Hills, New South Wales
Angus & Robertson books